This is a list of all tornadoes that were confirmed by local offices of the National Weather Service in the United States in May 2009.

United States yearly total

May

Note: 2 tornadoes were confirmed in the final totals, but do not have a listed rating.

May 1 event

May 2 event

May 3 event (Southeast derecho)

May 3 event (Utah)

May 4 event

May 5 event

May 6 event (Southeast)

May 6 event (Northwest)

May 7 event

May 8 event

May 9 event

May 10 event

May 12 event

May 13 event (Midwest)

May 13 event (Florida)

May 14 event

May 15 event

May 16 event

May 19 event (Colorado)

May 19 event (Florida)

May 22 event (Florida)

May 22 event (Arizona)

May 23 event

May 24 event (Northeast)

May 24 event (South/Southwest)

May 25 event

May 27 event

May 30 event

May 31 event

See also
Tornadoes of 2009

References

Tornadoes of 2009
2009, 05
May 2009 events in the United States